Inflammatory fibroid polyp (IFP) is a benign abnormal growth of tissue projecting into the lumen of the gastrointestinal tract.

Pathology
IFPs consist of spindle cells that are concentrically arranged around blood vessels and have inflammation, especially eosinophils.
They may have leiomyoma/schwannoma-like areas with nuclear palisading.

They typically stain with CD34 and vimentin, and, generally, do not stain with CD117 and S100.

The endoscopic differential diagnosis includes other benign, pre-malignant and malignant gastrointestinal polyps.

Morphological differential diagnosis 
Inflammatory myofibroblastic tumour (IMT)

See also 

 Inflammatory pseudotumor

References

External links 

Digestive system